Barranca District is one of five districts of the province Barranca in Peru.

References